Charles Mathias (1922–2010) was a U.S. Senator from Maryland from 1969 to 1987. Senator Mathias may also refer to:

James N. Mathias Jr. (born 1951), Maryland State Senate
Mathias Cormann (born 1970), member of the Australian Senate

See also
Senator Mathis (disambiguation)